Abell 262 is a galaxy cluster in the Abell catalogue. It is part of the Perseus–Pisces Supercluster, one of the largest known structures in the universe. Although its central galaxy, NGC 708, is a giant cD galaxy, most of its bright galaxies are spirals, which is unusual for a galaxy cluster. With approximately 200 members it is a comparatively small cluster.

See also
 Abell catalogue
 List of Abell clusters

References

 
262
Galaxy clusters
Abell richness class 0
Perseus-Pisces Supercluster
Andromeda (constellation)